Raigad district (Marathi pronunciation: [ɾaːjɡəɖ]), previously Colaba district, is a district in the Konkan division of Maharashtra, India.

The district was renamed to Raigad after the fort that was the first capital of the former Maratha Empire, which in turn was renamed from its earlier name - Rairi. The fort is located in the interior regions of the district, in dense forests on a west-facing spur of the Western Ghats of Sahyadri Range. In 2011 the district had a population of 2,634,200, compared to 2,207,929 in 2001. The name was changed in the regime of Chief Minister A. R. Antulay on 1 January 1981. In 2011 urban dwellers had increased to 36.91% from 24.22% in 2001. Alibag is the headquarters of Raigad district.

Raigad district's neighbouring districts are Mumbai, Thane districts on North, Pune district on East, Satara district on South East, Ratnagiri district is present on South side and Arabian sea on West.

History

Kulaba (also spelled Kolaba) district was split from Thane district in 1869. At this point, the northernmost parts of present-day Raigad district were retained in Thane district. Panvel, just across the bay from Mumbai, was not included in Kolaba district until 1883, and Karjat, an area in the north-east corner of modern Raigad district, was not placed in Kolaba district until 1891. Kolaba district was later renamed as Raigad district.

Geography

The district is bounded by Mumbai Harbour to the northwest, Thane district to the north, Pune district to the east, Ratnagiri district to the south and the Arabian Sea to the west. It includes the large natural harbour of Pen-Mandwa, which is immediately south of Mumbai harbour, and forming a single landform with it.

The northern part of the district is included in the planned metropolis of Navi Mumbai, consisting of Kharghar, Ulve node, New Panvel and Khanda Colony, Taloja, Kamothe and Kalamboli nodes as well as Uran City and its port, the JNPT.

The district includes cities/towns Kharghar, Taloja, Kalamboli, Panvel, Rasayani, Karjat, Khopoli, Matheran, Uran, Pen, Alibag, Murud-Janjira, Roha, Nagothane, Sudhagad-Pali, Mangaon, Mhasla, Shrivardhan, Mahad, Birwadi, Poladpur.  The largest city in terms of Population, Industrialization as well as Area is Panvel. The district also includes the isle of Gharapuri or Elephanta, located in Uran which has ancient Hindu and Buddhist caves.

Education
After the British took over the old Colaba and this region, they established four Anglo-Vernacular medium school and 30 government schools in the year 1865–66. In the year 1861 the first school for girls was started in Alibag. The Mission Church started the first English school in Alibag in 1879. Prabhakar Patil Education Society (PNP education Society) runs 27 Institutes: Five Primary English & Marathi Schools, Twenty Seven Secondary Marathi Schools, One Arts, Science & Commerce Jr. & Sr. College, One English & Marathi Medium D. Ed College, One B. Ed. College, One Polytechnic Institute and One MMS College. Securities and Exchange Board of India (SEBI) established National Institute of Securities Markets at Patalganga, tal Khalapur. Two more old and valuable institutions in Raigad District named Vasantrao Naik College Murud And Mhasla, established by the former Chief Minister of Maharashtra A. R. Antulay.
 
The Dr. Babasaheb Ambedkar Technological University is a unitary, autonomous university located at Lonere in Raigad district, established in 1989 under the Government of Maharashtra Act 1983.

Officer

Members of Parliament
 
Sunil Tatkare (NCP) - Raigad
Shrirang Barne (Shiv Sena) - Maval
 
 
Raigad constituency is shared with Ratnagiri district while Maval constituency is shared with Pune district.

Guardian Minister

list of Guardian Minister

District Magistrate/Collector

list of District Magistrate / Collector

District Justice

list of District Justice

District Police Commissioner

list of District Police Commissioner

President & Vice-President Zilla Parishad
President

list of President Zilla Parishad Raigad 

Vice-President

list of Vice-President Zilla Parishad Raigad

Chief Executive Officer Zilla Parishad

list of Chief Executive Officer Zilla Parishad

Sub-Divisional Officer
01) Alibaug
 
02) pen
 
03) Panvel
 
04) Karjat
 
05) Roha
 
06) Mangaon
 
07) Shrivardhan
 
08) Mahad

Tahasildar & Executive Magistrate
 
Alibag - Mr. Sachin Shezaal 
Karjat - Mr.  Vikram Deshamukh 
Khalapur - Mr. Ayub Tamboli 
Mahad - Mr. Suresh Kashid 
Mangaon - Mrs. Priyanka Aayre-Kamble
MhasalaMr.Sameer Ghare  
 
Murud
Panvel 
Pen - Mrs. Aruna Jadhav
Poladpur 
Roha
Shrivardhan - Mr. Gosavi 
Sudhagad Pali
Tala
Uran

Education
After the British took over the old Colaba and this region, they established four Anglo-Vernacular medium school and 30 government schools in the year 1865–66. In the year 1861 the first school for girls was started in Alibag. The Mission Church started the first English school in Alibag in 1879. Prabhakar Patil Education Society (PNP education Society) runs 27 Institutes: Five Primary English & Marathi Schools, Twenty Seven Secondary Marathi Schools, One Arts, Science & Commerce Jr. & Sr. College, One English & Marathi Medium D. Ed College, One B. Ed. College, One Polytechnic Institute and One MMS College. Securities and Exchange Board of India (SEBI) established National Institute of Securities Markets at Patalganga, tal Khalapur. Two more old and valuable institutions in Raigad District named Vasantrao Naik College Murud And Mhasla, established by the former Chief Minister of Maharashtra A. R. Antulay.

The Dr. Babasaheb Ambedkar Technological University is a unitary, autonomous university located at Lonere in Raigad district, established in 1989 under the Government of Maharashtra Act 1983.

Administrative subdivisions
Raigad district is divided into eight subdivisions, with fifteen talukas, and 1,967 villages.

Municipal Civic Bodies

Panvel (in Navi Mumbai city) is the main Municipal Corporations responsible for services. MMRDA, CIDCO, and NAINA are the special planning authorities operational in Raigad district.

Municipal Councils include Matheran, Karjat, Khopoli, Uran, Pen, Alibag, Murud-Janjira, Roha, Shrivardhan, Mahad, Mangaon. Nagar Panchayats include Neral, Poladpur, Khalapur, Tala, Mhasla, and Sudhagad. Proposed Municipal Councils include Rees-Mohopada, Neral-Mamdapur, Pali-Sudhagad, Tala, Mhasla, and Poladpur.

Demographics

According to the 2011 census Raigad district has a population of 2,634,200, roughly equal to the nation of Kuwait or the US state of Nevada. This gives it a ranking of 153rd in India (out of a total of 640). Its population growth rate over the decade 2001-2011 was 19.31%. Raigad has a sex ratio of 959 females for every 1000 males, and a literacy rate of 83.14%. 36.83% of the population lived in urban areas. Scheduled Castes and Scheduled Tribes made up 5.12% and 11.58% of the population respectively.

At the time of the 2011 Census of India, 79.04% of the population in the district spoke Marathi, 7.06% Hindi, 5.85% Urdu and 0.90% Gujarati as their first language.

The most populous tribes are the Katkari, Thakar and Mahadev Koli.

Transport 

Raigad District is connected to Mumbai by Sion Panvel Expressway. The Mumbai-Pune expressway and NH4 passes through Panvel. NH 66, which starts at Panvel, traverses the whole district. The Konkan Railway line starts at Roha and passes through Mangaon and Veer in Mahad. The Central Railway Line of Mumbai to Pune passes through Karjat with Extension Line for Karjat to Khopoli. Panvel Junction is the most important railway station in the district; it is connected to Mumbai (by both the Harbour Line and Main Line of Central Railway), Thane (by Trans-Harbour Line), Roha, Vasai (Western Railway) and Karjat. All trains, ranging from passengers to Rajdhanis stop here, and it is considered the gateway for travelling south. There is a narrow gauge railroad from Neral to Matheran, called the Matheran Hill Railway. The main ports are JNPT, Mandava, Revas, Murud, Dighi and Shrivardhan .

References

External links

 

 
1869 establishments in India
Districts of Maharashtra
Konkan division